Hari Connor Vinay McCoy (born 11 September 2002) is an English footballer who plays as a winger for Weymouth.

Club career

Tampines Rovers
As a youth player, McCoy joined Tampines Rovers in 2018.

ASD San Luca
Before the second half of 2020–21, he signed for Serie D side ASD San Luca in Italy after joining the youth academy of Portuguese club Rio Ave in 2019.

Balestier Khalsa
Before the 2022 season, he signed for Balestier Khalsa in Singapore and later debuted on 8 May 2022 against Tampines Rovers.

Weymouth
In November 2022, he joined National League South side Weymouth.

Career statistics

Club

Personal life
McCoy is eligible to represent Singapore and England at international level.

References

External links
 

2002 births
Living people
Singaporean footballers
Association football wingers
Singapore Premier League players
Balestier Khalsa FC players
Singaporean expatriate footballers
Expatriate footballers in Italy
English footballers
Weymouth F.C. players
National League (English football) players
English expatriate footballers
English expatriate sportspeople in Italy
English expatriate sportspeople in Singapore